Na Yung is the northwesternmost district (amphoe) of Udon Thani province, northeastern Thailand.

History
The area was separated from Nam Som district and created as a minor district (king amphoe) on 1 January 1988. It was upgraded to a full district on 7 September 1995.

Geography
Neighboring districts are (from the southeast clockwise) Ban Phue and Nam Som of Udon Thani Province, Pak Chom of Loei province, Sangkhom and Pho Tak of Nong Khai province.

Administration
The district is divided into four sub-districts (tambons), which are further subdivided into 40 villages (mubans). There are no municipal (thesaban) areas, and four tambon administrative organizations (TAO).

References

External links
amphoe.com

Na Yung